Clibanarius fonticola is the only species of hermit crab in the world that lives in fresh water. It is found on the island of Espiritu Santo, Vanuatu. While a number of other hermit crabs are terrestrial or live in estuarine habitats, C. fonticola is the only species that spends its life in fresh water. It lives in a pool fed by springs near the village of Matevulu, close to an abandoned airstrip. The adult hermit crabs of this species all use shells of Clithon corona.

References

Hermit crabs
Endemic fauna of Vanuatu
Freshwater crustaceans
Crustaceans described in 1990